Anda is a county-level city in western Heilongjiang province, People's Republic of China, located on the Harbin-Manzhouli Railway (formerly known as the Chinese Eastern Railway) about  southeast of Daqing and  northwest of Harbin, capital of Heilongjiang, and is under the administration of Suihua City. Home to China's forage and dairy industries, more than  out of Anda's  total area is made up of grasslands.

History

Archaeological sites in the area suggest human activities such as hunting and fishing in Anda can be traced back to 6000 years ago during the Neolithic Era.

Climate
Anda has a monsoon-influenced humid continental climate (Köppen Dwa). A majority of the annual precipitation falls in July and August alone. With monthly percent possible sunshine ranging from 53% in July to 70% in February, the city receives 2,746 hours of bright sunshine annually.

Administrative divisions
Anda administers four subdistricts, thirteen towns, and one townships. 

Subdistricts:
Xinxing Subdistrict, Tiexi Subdistrict, Anhong Subdistrict, Dongcheng Subdistrict

Towns:
Anda, Jixinggang, Renmin, Laohugang, Zhongben, Taipingzhuang, Wanbaoshan, Yangcao, Changde, Shengping, Wolitun, Huoshishan, Gudahu

Townships:
Xianyuan Township

References

External links
Official website of Anda Government

 
County level divisions of Heilongjiang
Cities in Heilongjiang
Suihua